The Llansawel television relay station is sited on high ground to the north of the village of Llansawel in Carmarthenshire, South Wales. It was originally built in 1986 as a fill-in relay for UHF analogue television. It consists of a 17 m wooden telegraph pole standing on a hillside which is itself about 160 m above sea level. The transmissions are beamed southwards. The Llansawel transmission station is owned and operated by Arqiva.

Llansawel transmitter is classed as an indirect off-air relay of Carmel. It re-radiates a signal received off-air from Talley about 5 km to the southeast, which itself is a direct off-air relay of Carmel. When it came, the digital switchover process for Llansawel duplicated the timing at Carmel with the first stage taking place on 26 August 2009 and with the second stage being completed on 23 September 2009. After the switchover process, analogue channels had ceased broadcasting permanently and the Freeview digital TV services were radiated at an ERP of 2 W each.

Channels listed by frequency

Analogue television

Spring/Summer 1986 - 26 August 2009
Llansawel entered service in late spring/early summer 1986, and (being in Wales) transmitted the S4C variant of Channel 4.

Analogue and digital television

26 August 2009 - 23 September 2009
The UK's digital switchover commenced at Carmel (and therefore at Llansawel and all its other relays) on 26 August 2009. Analogue BBC Two Wales on channel 28 was first to close, and was replaced by the new digital BBC A mux which started up in 64-QAM and at full power (i.e. 2 W).

Digital television

23 September 2009 - present
The remaining analogue TV services were closed down and the digital multiplexes took over on the original analogue channels' frequencies.

References

External links
The Transmission Gallery: Llansawel

Transmitter sites in Wales
Carmel UHF 625-line Transmitter Group